The 2014 Minnesota House of Representatives election was held in the U.S. state of Minnesota on November 4, 2014, to elect members to the House of Representatives of the 89th Minnesota Legislature. A primary election was held in several districts on August 12, 2014.

The Republican Party of Minnesota won a majority of seats, defeating the majority of the Minnesota Democratic–Farmer–Labor Party (DFL). This was the first election for the DFL since it won a majority of seats in the 2012 election, after losing a majority to the Republicans in the 2010 election. The new Legislature convened on January 6, 2015.

Retiring members

DFL
 John Benson, 44B
 Kathy Brynaert, 19B
 Tom Huntley, 7A
 Michael Paymar, 64B
 Steve Simon, 46B

Republican
 Jim Abeler, 35A
 Mike Beard, 55A
 Mike Benson, 26B
 David FitzSimmons, 30B
 Mary Liz Holberg, 58A
 Andrea Kieffer, 53B
 Ernie Leidiger, 47A
 Pam Myhra, 56A
 Kelby Woodard, 20A
 Kurt Zellers, 34B

Competitive districts
According to an analysis by the Star Tribune, based on past election results, fundraising, and other factors, 16 seats were vulnerable to switching parties. 14 were held by the DFL and two by the Republicans. According to MinnPost, 15 seats had the best chance of switching parties, based on the district's political lean (as calculated by MinnPost), previous election results, and the strength of the respective candidates. 13 were held by the DFL and two by the Republicans.

Primary election results

General election

Opinion polling

Results

District results

The following sought election but later withdrew and did not file an affidavit of candidacy.

Seats changing parties

Analysis
The Republicans made most of their gains in rural districts, continuing a trend of rural districts leaning more towards the Republicans and suburban districts leaning more towards the DFL. Of the 11 districts they gained from the DFL, 10 are outside of the Twin Cities metropolitan area.

Seven rural DFL incumbents who voted for legalizing same-sex marriage lost their seats, despite their districts having supported a proposed constitutional amendment in 2012 to ban it. Yet two rural DFL incumbents who voted against legalizing same-sex marriage also lost their seats.

Split-ticket voters determined the outcome of several key races. Nearly 450,000 voters chose one party's candidate for a House seat, but then switched to pick a different party's candidate for the United States Senate or governor. Eight of the 11 districts the DFL lost featured at least some ticket splitting between DFL candidate for governor Mark Dayton and/or U.S. Senate candidate Al Franken and the Republican House candidate. Nearly all of the DFL candidates who lost came from districts in which many voters supported Republicans in previous elections, including candidates for governor Republican Tom Emmer over Democrat Mark Dayton in 2010 and presidential candidates Republican Mitt Romney over Democratic President Barack Obama in 2012.

Outside and party spending reached large levels in several House districts compared to what has been spent in the past as Republican groups focused their attention on the House rather than statewide races. In some races, spending reached $500,000.

Turnout was the lowest in more than 20 years, with slightly over 50 percent of eligible voters having voted. Turnout across the state was lower compared to 2010. It was slightly lower in the Twin Cities and surrounding suburbs, helping suburban DFL candidates win in those areas. In rural Minnesota, turnout was down by about 10 percentage points since 2010. Much of the drop-off was among DFL voters, while those who did vote in those districts were likely over the age of 45.

See also
 Minnesota Senate election, 2012
 Minnesota gubernatorial election, 2014
 Minnesota elections, 2014

References

External links
 Elections & Voting - Minnesota Secretary of State

2014 Minnesota elections
Minnesota House of Representatives elections
Minnesota House of Representatives